El Vergel Airport is an airport  west of Riñihue, a lakeside village in the Los Ríos Region of Chile.

See also

Transport in Chile
List of airports in Chile

References

External links
OpenStreetMap - El Vergel
OurAirports - El Vergel
FallingRain - El Vergel Airport

Airports in Los Ríos Region